The scale insect genus Porphyrophora is a large group in the family Margarodidae, which includes the insects Polish cochineal and Armenian cochineal formerly used in dye production.

References 

Margarodidae
Sternorrhyncha genera